Elius dilatatus, is a species of click beetle found in India, Sri Lanka, Malaysia and Singapore.

Description
Body length is about 16 to 17 mm. Body reddish brown with a yellowish, long and dense pubescence. Antennae with 11 antennomeres which are densely pubescent. Scape is shorter than eye. Second antennomere is globular, whereas third is triangular and elongate. Labrum is narrow, and semi-elliptical. Mandibles narrow with one apical and one subapical tooth. Pronotum slightly wider than long, and slightly narrowed to apex. Pronotum with coarse and very dense  punctuation. Prosternal spine is flat with narrowe and rounded apex. Metacoxal plate strongly narrowed laterally. Tibial spurs are long. Scutellum subpentagonal with rounded distal margin. Elytra convex with punctuated and grooved striae and slightly convex interstices. Male has subtriangular Tergite 8 which is almost completely setous and clothed with microtrichiae. Aedeagus is elongate with ventrally fused parameres.

References 

Elateridae
Insects of Sri Lanka
Insects described in 1859